Apotomis lineana is a species of moth, belonging to the genus Apotomis.

It is native to Europe.

References

External links

Olethreutini